Riley Gibbs (born November 3, 1996) is an American sailor. He qualified to represent Team USA in the 2020 Tokyo Summer Olympics, competing with Anna Weis in the Nacra 17 (Mixed Two-Person Multihull) event.

Career highlights 

 1st, Sabot, Junior Sabot Nationals, 2010
 2nd, 29er, ISAF Youth World Championship, 2014
 1st, 505, North American Championship, 2016
 1st, Nacra 17, Oakcliff Sailing Triple Crown #3 (Oyster Bay, NY), 2017
 4th, IKA-Formula Kite, Formula Kite World Championships (Muscat, OMA), 2017
 4th, Nacra 17, 2018 World Cup Series Final – Marseille (Marseille, FRA), 2018
 1st, Nacra 17, Pan American Games Lima 2019 (Paracas, PER), 2019

References

External links 
 
 
 
 

1996 births
Living people
American male sailors (sport)
Olympic sailors of the United States
Sailors at the 2020 Summer Olympics – Nacra 17
Pan American Games medalists in sailing
Pan American Games gold medalists for the United States
Sailors at the 2019 Pan American Games
Medalists at the 2019 Pan American Games
Sportspeople from Long Beach, California